The General's Daughter is a 1992 novel by the American author Nelson DeMille. The novel introduces protagonist Paul Brenner, who is also featured in DeMille's novels Up Country and The Panther. The General's Daughter was made into a 1999 film of the same name, starring John Travolta and Madeleine Stowe. In the movie, Captain Ann Campbell's first name was changed to Elisabeth.

Plot
Captain Ann Campbell is a West Point graduate, the daughter of legendary General "Fighting Joe" Campbell. She is the pride of Fort Hadley until, one morning, her body is found naked and bound on the firing range. Paul Brenner is a member of the Army's elite undercover investigative unit, and the man in charge of this politically explosive case. Teamed with rape specialist Cynthia Sunhill, with whom he once had a tempestuous, doomed affair, Brenner is about to learn just how many people were sexually, emotionally, and dangerously involved with the Army's "golden girl", and how the neatly pressed uniforms and honor codes of the military hide a corruption as rank as Ann Campbell's shocking secret life.

References 

1992 American novels
American novels adapted into films
American thriller novels
Novels by Nelson DeMille
United States Military Academy in fiction

ru:Генеральская дочь (фильм)